Moosach is a municipality in the Upper Bavarian district of Ebersberg and a member of the Verwaltungsgemeinschaft (administrative community) of Glonn.

Geography 
The community lies in a picturesque setting in an ice-age moraine landscape about 500 m in elevation and lends itself well to hiking. In the heights of the moraine that ring the town are lakes, among them the Steinsee, a bathing lake also favoured by visitors from Munich. Somewhat farther away lies the Kitzlsee, a protected landscape.

Moosach comprises a number of surrounding hamlets and lone homesteads such as Falkenberg (with a stable and a beergarden), Baumhau, Altenburg and Berghofen.

History 
In 1990, Moosach celebrated 1,200 years of existence, witnessed in a donation document of the Roman Catholic Archdiocese of Munich and Freising. The community's name goes back to the Moosach brook: "Ache flowing through the moss", Ache being a regional word meaning "swiftly flowing water". The Moosach rises from 7 springs at the foot of the mountain on which stands the Kloster Maria Altenburg (monastery).

In the course of administrative reforms in Bavaria, the current community came into being with the community edict of 1818.

References

External links 
  

Ebersberg (district)